The H.A. McKim Building is a historic building located at the southwest corner of Main and Oddie Streets in Tonopah, Nevada. The building was constructed in 1906 for Hiram Albert McKim, who had begun a mercantile business in the town two years prior. Carpenter craftsman J.J. Finley and stonemason E.E. Burdick constructed the building, a two-story stone building designed in the Classical Revival style. The building's design includes an ashlar front facade, a pediment at its parapet, second-story windows ornamented with voussoirs and keystones, and a metal cornice. McKim's store ultimately became the largest mercantile store in central Nevada.

The store was added to the National Register of Historic Places on May 20, 1982.

References

Commercial buildings on the National Register of Historic Places in Nevada
National Register of Historic Places in Tonopah, Nevada
Neoclassical architecture in Nevada
Commercial buildings completed in 1906
1906 establishments in Nevada